Dingxi, also known as Longyou is a prefecture-level city in the southeast of Gansu province, People's Republic of China. As of the 2020 census, its population was 2,524,097 inhabitants, of which 422,383 lived in the built-up (or metro) area made of Anding urban district.

History
Dingxi was important in the development of some of China's earliest cultures, specifically along the Wei River, one of the Yellow River's biggest tributaries. Numerous Neolithic sites from various cultures are found throughout the area.

A series of earthquakes in July 2013 killed at least 95 people and destroyed 120,000 homes.

Geography
The Wei River, a tributary of the Yellow River flows through the district and provides it with the majority of its water. Dingxi is semi-arid, with little precipitation. Even though sunlight here can be intense, temperatures are generally cool. The surrounding terrain is mostly loess hills and ravines in the north and highlands in the south.

After the Qianlong Emperor period (18th century), the land of Dingxi went from lush grasslands and forests to being severely deforested as a result of war, famines and overpopulation.

Climate
Dingxi has a monsoon- influenced cool semi-arid climate (Köppen BSk) characterised like most of eastern Gansu by warm to very warm, humid summers and freezing, virtually snowless winters.

Administration
Dingxi has 1 urban district, 6 counties, and 119 towns with a total population of 2,698,622.

Economy
Dingxi has been one of the most poverty-stricken regions in Gansu province and China as a whole. Up to 1999, some citizens still lacked food and clothing. Although most of Gansu is arid, in other regions of the province a large portion of farmland is irrigated, whereas in Dingxi this was not the case. Especially after the 1960s, the agricultural output of Dingxi plummeted due to land degradation.

Agriculture and natural resource based industries are the key to Dingxi's economy. There are more than 300 different kinds of Chinese medicinal plants and herbs found in the area. Dingxi's Anding County is China's number one grower of yams. Zanthoxylum (also called Sichuan Pepper or prickly ash fruit), walnuts, wild apricots, and other fruit are some of Dingxi's famous dried exports. Potato is an important crop, and Dingxi has been described as the 'Potato Capital of China'.

Culture 
The local Dingxi dialect of Central Plains Mandarin has only three tones instead of the normal four.

Food 

 Shouzhuarou, cooked mutton on the bone
 Dingxi Niangpi, a type of noodle similar to Liangpi
 Longxi Qianrou, a dish made from donkey tail
 Minxian Fenyu, a type of noodle that looks like a small fish or tadpole

Transportation 
G22 Qingdao–Lanzhou Expressway
G30 Lianyungang–Khorgas Expressway
China National Highway 312
Longhai railway
Xuzhou-Lanzhou High-Speed Railway

See also 

 Xihaigu, region in Ningxia with similar landscape and economic issues

References

External links

Dingxi Official Website 

 
Prefecture-level divisions of Gansu